Mesoleuca gratulata, known generally as the western white-ribboned carpet or half-white carpet moth, is a species of geometrid moth in the family Geometridae. It is found in North America.

The MONA or Hodges number for Mesoleuca gratulata is 7308.

Subspecies
These two subspecies belong to the species Mesoleuca gratulata:
 Mesoleuca gratulata gratulata
 Mesoleuca gratulata latialbata Barnes & McDunnough

References

Further reading

External links

 

Hydriomenini
Articles created by Qbugbot
Moths described in 1862